Caroline Nilsson Troy (born 1962) is an American politician serving as a member of the Idaho House of Representatives from the 5th district. Elected in November 2014, she assumed office on December 1, 2014.

Early life and education
Born Caroline Nilsson, she was raised in Lewiston, where she attended St. Stanislaus Catholic School. In 1971, her family moved to Botswana, where her father managed a research farm. The family returned to Idaho in 1977 to work on their large farm and ranch operation in Latah, Clearwater, and Nez Perce counties. Nilsson graduated from Orofino High School. She earned a Bachelor of Science degree in communications from the University of Idaho in 1984.

Career 
After graduating from college, Nilsson moved to Southwick, where she worked in farming and ranching on family land north of the Nez Percé Indian Reservation.

In 1992, Nilsson began her career as a professional fundraiser, starting at Tri-State Hospital Foundation in Clarkston, Washington. She also became active in Republican Party politics. Later, she worked in development for the University of Idaho and Washington State University. She started her own business and is the president of Nilsson Advisory Group, which helps non-profits secure private support.

Idaho House of Representatives

2020 
Troy was unopposed in the Republican primary. Troy defeated two opponents in the general election, Democrat nominee Renee Love and Constitution Party nominee James Hartley with 55.4% of the vote.

2018 
Troy was unopposed in the Republican primary. Troy defeated Democratic nominee Laurene Sorensen with 53.7% of the vote.

2016 
Troy was unopposed in the Republican primary. Troy defeated two opponents in the general election, Democrat Laurene Sorensen and Independent Ken De Vries, with 50.1% of the vote.

2014 
When long-time Democratic state legislator Shirley Ringo decided to run for Congress in 2014, Nilsson Troy became a candidate for her seat in District 5B, running unopposed in the Republican primary. In the general election she defeated Democrat Gary Osborn, of Troy and Independent David Suswal of Deary, winning with a plurality of 606 votes.

Committee assignments
Agricultural Affairs Committee
Appropriations Committee
Joint Finance-Appropriations Committee
Joint Legislative Oversight Committee
Judiciary, Rules and Administration Committee

Troy previously served on the Health and Welfare Committee from 2014 to 2016, the Business Committee from 2014 to 2018, and the Revenue and Taxation Committee from 2016 to 2018.

Personal life 
She is married to Dave Troy, owner of Troy Insurance in Lewiston. They reside in Genesee, Idaho and have four daughters.

Election history

References

Living people
1962 births
People from Lewiston, Idaho
People from Latah County, Idaho
University of Idaho alumni
Women state legislators in Idaho
Republican Party members of the Idaho House of Representatives
21st-century American politicians
21st-century American women politicians